Corte may refer to:
 Corte, a commune in Corsica, France
 Arrondissement of Corte, a district in Corsica, France
 USC Corte, a French football team

People with the surname
 Frank Corte, Jr., a U.S. businessman and politician

See also 
 Corte Brugnatella, a commune in the province of Piacenza, Italy
 Corte de' Cortesi con Cignone, a commune in the province of Cremona, Italy
 Corte de' Frati, a town and commune in the province of Cremona, Italy
 Corte Franca, a town and commune in the province of Brescia, Italy
 Corte Palasio,  a town and commune in the province of Lodi, Italy
 Corte Madera, California, a town in the United States
 Corto (disambiguation)
 Corte-Real (disambiguation)
 Cortes (disambiguation)
 Cortez (disambiguation)